Esow Alben is an Indian track cyclist from Andaman and Nicobar Islands.  

He is the first Indian to win medal at the 2018 UCI Junior Track Cycling World Championships when he won Silver at Keirin event in Aigle, Switzerland. In same year he also won 3 Golds in Team Sprint, Keirin and 200m Time Trial at Junior Asian Track Cycling championships  in Nilai, Malaysia. 

In 2019, Esow won 3 Golds in Sprint, Team Sprint and Keirin event at Junior Asian Track Cycling championships in Jakarta, Indonesia.

The same year Esow alongside his teammates Ronaldo Singh Laitonjam and Rojit Singh Yanglem won Gold in 2019 UCI Junior Track Cycling World Championships at Team Sprint event in Frankfurt (Oder), Germany. In same Championship he won Individual Silver in Individual Sprint event and Bronze in Individual Keirin event.

References

External links 
 Esow – India’s Junior Cyclist with a vision – Cycling Federation of India

Indian male cyclists
Living people
Cyclists at the 2018 Asian Games
2001 births
People from Port Blair
Asian Games competitors for India
Cyclists at the 2022 Commonwealth Games
Commonwealth Games competitors for India
Indian track cyclists